Altermodern, a portmanteau word defined by Nicolas Bourriaud, is an attempt at contextualizing art made in today's global context as a reaction against standardisation and commercialism. It is also the title of the Tate Britain's fourth Triennial exhibition curated by Bourriaud.

Concept
In his keynote speech to the 2005 Art Association of Australia & New Zealand Conference, Nicolas Bourriaud explained:

This “reloading process” of  modernism according to the twenty-first-century issues could be called altermodernism, a movement connected to the creolisation of cultures and the fight for autonomy, but also the possibility of producing singularities in a more and more standardized world.

Altermodern can essentially be read as an artist working in a hypermodern world or with supermodern ideas or themes.

Exhibitions

Tate Britain 2009
The Tate exhibition includes a series of four one-day events (called "Prologues"), aiming to "introduce and provoke debate" around the Triennial's themes. Each Prologue includes lectures, performances, film and a manifesto text and attempts to define what the curator sees as the four main facets of Altermodern

 The end of postmodernism
 Cultural hybridisation
 Travelling as a new way to produce forms
 The expanding formats of art

References

External links
 Guardian.co.uk
 Tate.org.uk
 Tate Website: Altermodern
  Interview with Nicolas Bourriaud

Visual arts genres
Contemporary art exhibitions
Criticism of postmodernism
Modernity
Art movements
Art history